Kaleidoscope is the fourth studio album by progressive rock band Transatlantic. It was released on January 27, 2014.

Background
Transatlantic released a music video for the song "Shine" on December 2, 2013. Two weeks later, the band's cover of the Yes song "And You and I", a bonus track on Kaleidoscope, was released on record label Inside Out's SoundCloud page. A video for "Black As the Sky" was released on January 27, 2014, to coincide with the album's release. On September 11, 2014, Kaleidoscope won 'Album of the Year' at the third annual Progressive Music Awards.

Track listing
All tracks written and arranged by Neal Morse, Mike Portnoy, Roine Stolt and Pete Trewavas, except where noted.

Special edition bonus disc

Personnel
Transatlantic
Neal Morse — keyboards, acoustic guitars, vocals
Roine Stolt — electric guitars, vocals, percussion, additional keyboards
Pete Trewavas — bass guitar, vocals
Mike Portnoy — drums, vocals

Additional musicians
Chris Carmichael — cello
Rich Mouser — pedal steel guitar on "Beyond the Sun"
Daniel Gildenlöw — special guest vocals on "Written in Your Heart"

Production
Transatlantic — production
Rich Mouser — mixing
Jerry Guidroz — engineering

Other
Thomas Ewerhard — design and layout
Per Nordin — Transatlantic Ship
Joey Pippin — band photos
Jerry Guidroz — Kaleidoscope photos

Source:

Charts

References

2014 albums
Transatlantic (band) albums
Inside Out Music albums